Ramkhamhaeng Advent International School (RAIS;) is an international school in Bang Kapi District, Bangkok, Thailand, established in 1999.

Ramkhamhaeng Advent International School (RAIS) is a privately owned Christian school serving students from Daycare to Grade 12 in the greater Bangkok area. It is operated by the G.J. Education Company Ltd. In August 1999, RAIS came into existence under the name, Ramkhamhaeng Adventist International School (a minor alteration was made in the school's name in 2005). In the first school year, RAIS enrolled sixty-nine students, and has experienced a consistent growth in enrollment in each subsequent year since the school's inception. Most recent enrollment figures show the total number of students reaching nearly seven hundred in grades K-12 and English as a Foreign Language (EFL) without counting the feeding programs. In addition to stressing academic achievement, RAIS curriculum places an equal importance on character development. Students are taught and encouraged to demonstrate respect for diverse cultures and people both in words and in deeds. The academics at RAIS revolve around scholastic learning and moral maturation.

The facilities include fully air-conditioned classrooms, indoor and outdoor playgrounds, mess hall, auditorium, air-conditioned gymnasium, Basketball courts, Science labs, three air-conditioned cafeterias, and a soccer field.

This school is a member of Thailand International Schools Association, accredited by Western Association of Schools and Colleges,  and fully approved by Thai Ministry of Education.

References

2. http://rais.ac.th/international-school-in-bangkok-rais/   Ramkhamhaeng Advent International School. Retrieved on 7 February 2018

3. https://bangkokpost.com/learning/international-school/1282/ramkhamhaeng-advent-international-school . Retrieved on 18 February 2018

External links 

 Ramkhamhaeng Advent International School official website
 Ramkhamhaeng Advent International School in ISAT

International schools in Bangkok
Bang Kapi district
Educational institutions established in 1999
1999 establishments in Thailand
Private schools in Thailand